Stephen Jeffery "Dick" Uluave (born 1954) is a former rugby league footballer who represented both New Zealand and Tonga at international level.

Early years
Born in Tonga in 1954, Uluave emigrated to New Zealand in 1972.

Playing career
Uluave represented the Manwatu district and is known for being the only ever Manawatu representative to play for the national side.

He also played for New Zealand Māori. He toured the United Kingdom in 1983 with the New Zealand Māori side.

In 1979 he was selected for the New Zealand national rugby league team and played in two test matches, scoring one try.

Uluave played for Tonga in the 1986 Pacific Cup and was named in the team of the tournament. He again represented Tonga at the 1988 Pacific Cup.

References

1954 births
New Zealand rugby league players
New Zealand national rugby league team players
Tonga national rugby league team players
New Zealand Māori rugby league players
New Zealand Māori rugby league team players
Manawatu rugby league team players
Rugby league wingers
Living people